Spotz may refer to:

People
Katie Spotz (b. 1987), an American adventurer
Leslie Spotz, an American pianist

See also

Spot (disambiguation)